Hanoch Albeck (Hebrew: חנוך אלבק) (August 7, 1890 - January 9, 1972) was a professor of Talmud at the Hebrew University in Jerusalem, Israel. He was a foremost scholar of the Mishna  and one of the pioneers of the scientific approach to Mishna study.

Biography
Hanoch's father Shalom Albeck was the editor of a number of works by 
Rishonim including Raavan, Meiri on tractate Yevamot, and HaEshkol by Abraham ben Isaac of Narbonne. Hanoch studied at the Vienna rabbinical academy and he received rabbinical ordination in 1915. In 1921 he received a degree from the University of Vienna. Between 1926 and 1936 Albeck taught in the Hochschule für die Wissenschaft des Judentums in Berlin. 
Albeck married Hendel Weiss (the sister of Abraham Weiss), and the two had three children. Two of his children are Michael Albeck, a lecturer in organic chemistry, and Shalom Albeck, a lecturer in Jewish law (and husband of advocate Pliah Albeck), both at Bar Ilan University. His grandson is Amnon Albeck a Professor of Chemistry and Rector at Bar-Ilan University. Albeck's son in law, Yoseph Aryeh Bachrach, was killed in the 1948 Arab–Israeli War in the battle for Jerusalem, leaving behind a wife and two children.

Academic career
In 1935, Albeck immigrated to Mandatory Palestine where he was appointed as professor and head of the Talmud department at the Hebrew University in Jerusalem, a position he held for 25 years.

Albeck, a religiously observant Jew, published a number of books in Hebrew and German on rabbinical literature, including "Introduction to the Mishna", "Studies in Baraita and Tosephta", "Introduction to the Talmuds", and others. In addition, he published numerous articles in the journal Tarbiẕ. Albeck also wrote a simple and concise commentary on the Mishna, appending longer footnotes at the ends of each volume. Pinchas Kehati sometimes quotes this work in his own commentary on the Mishna. While the vocalization (niqqud), vocalized by Hanoch Yelon, received special attention in Albeck's edition, the text did not, and therefore Albeck's Mishna is not a fully scientific version of the latter. Albeck's version was written, both stylistically and in its use of the Vilna text, as a continuation and expansion of the uncompleted earlier work of Hayyim Nahman Bialik. Albeck's commentary to the Mishna received wide acclaim, however, Albeck's overall approach to the commentary was criticized by Ephraim Urbach.  The authorship of the commentary to Seder Nezikin was the subject of controversy, as Dr. Mordehai Margulies claimed he was the author of the commentary and Albeck served as the editor. Following a lawsuit, a compromise was reached in which a notice was put in the newer editions of the commentary acknowledging Margulies' contribution.     

Albeck's teachers include David Zvi Miller and Avigdor Optowitzer. His students include Avraham Goldberg and Abraham Joshua Heschel, one of the foremost Jewish thinkers in the 20th century.

Awards and recognition
In 1957 it was announced that Albeck was to receive the Israel prize; however, as a matter of principle Albeck refused to accept the award.

In 1959 Albeck was elected as a member of the Israel Academy of Sciences and Humanities.
 
In 1969 Albeck was awarded the Bialik Prize for Jewish thought.

Published works
 "Introduction to the Mishna", Bialik Institute, reprinted in 2005.
 "Introduction to the Talmuds", Dvir (1987)
 "Studies in Baraita and Tosephta", Mossad HaRav Kook, Jerusalem (1969)
 "The Six Orders of the Mishna", Bialik Institute, last reprinted in 2008
 "Sefer Haeshkol by Abraham ben Isaac of Narbonne", edited by Shalom and Hanoch Albeck, Wagshall, Jerusalem, reprinted in 1984

See also
List of Bialik Prize recipients

References

1890 births
1972 deaths
Talmudists
Academic staff of the Hebrew University of Jerusalem
Members of the Israel Academy of Sciences and Humanities
Burials at the Jewish cemetery on the Mount of Olives